Rings (stylized as rings) is a 2005 American horror short film. It was initially released as an extra disc with a re-release of The Ring on DVD. The events in Rings lead up to the sequel The Ring Two, on whose DVD Rings is also included as a bonus feature.

Plot
Some time after the events of The Ring, Samara Morgan's videotape has spread, as each person who sees the video makes a copy and shows it to someone else. A subculture has grown surrounding the video: people wait to see how close to the seven-day deadline they can get. When they grow too afraid to go on any longer, they show the tape to the next assigned person. During the interval, some create videos documenting their experiences to be posted to websites devoted to the videotape phenomenon. Groups that have watched the video are called "rings".

The film is focused on Jake Pierce, the latest member of one such ring. The ring has also recruited its next member, Tim who will watch the tape when Jake cracks. Eddie, a member, says that very few have ever been able to make it to day seven before cracking, and everyone who did has died. He tells Jake to make sure to record everything he sees. Jake is amazed at what he experiences at first, and Vanessa, another member, says she wants Jake to make it to day seven.

However, Jake's experiences soon turn scary, as he starts seeing visions of Samara suddenly popping up wherever he goes, and has a similar dream that Rachel Keller had from the first film of Samara grabbing his arm, leaving a bruise there. After several more unsettling experiences, he cracks on the sixth day, but Tim refuses to watch the tape. It is revealed that Vanessa is the one who made Tim refuse to watch the tape, as she wants to see what happens on day seven. This leaves Jake without someone to pass the curse onto.

By the next day, he's become so desperate he tries to play the video on the display models at an electronics store, but is caught and thrown out by a security guard who is a member of rings, and knows what the tape does. Jake begins dialing random numbers, hoping to find somebody to show the tape. Finally, he thinks of Emily, a girl he goes to school with. He invites her over without mentioning the video. Before she arrives, he experiences a vision in which Samara arrives and he tries to break the TV, though she comes out anyway. She reaches through the screen on his video camera and the vision ends.

An hour before the deadline, Emily agrees to come, leading to the opening sequence of The Ring Two; Vanessa is seen encouraging Emily by nodding when she is making her decision to go to Jake's house.

Cast
 Ryan Merriman as Jake Pierce
 Emily VanCamp as Emily 
 Kelly Stables as Samara Morgan
 Alexandra Breckenridge as Vanessa
 Josh Wise as Timothy "Tim" Rivers
 Justin Allen as Eddie
 Andrew D'Amico as Store Employee

Reception
The short film garnered positive reviews from both critics and audiences who purchased the special edition of the first film; released shortly before The Ring Two. Felix Vasquex Jr. of Cinema Crazed said, "...a very sleek and morbid short film, and one infinitely more enjoyable and tense than the sequel could be".

References

External links
 
 
 
 She Is Here - the DreamWorks viral marketing site

2005 films
2005 direct-to-video films
2005 horror films
2005 short films
American teen horror films
American horror short films
Direct-to-video interquel films
DreamWorks Pictures films
Techno-horror films
Films directed by Jonathan Liebesman
The Ring (franchise)
Films with screenplays by Ehren Kruger
2000s English-language films
2000s American films